The Stranger is a 1967 film by Italian film director Luchino Visconti, based on Albert Camus's 1942 novel The Stranger, with Marcello Mastroianni.

Plot

Arthur Mersault's friend Raymond beats his girlfriend and is sued by her. In court, Mersault testifies to his friend's advantage. Raymond is off the hook, but now his girlfriend's male relatives stalk Mersault. He shoots one of them and ends up in prison.

Cast
 Marcello Mastroianni as Arthur Meursault
 Anna Karina as Marie Cardona
 Bernard Blier as the Defense counsel
 Georges Wilson as the Examining magistrate
 Bruno Cremer as Priest
 Pierre Bertin as the judge
 Jacques Herlin as the Director of the rest home
 Marc Laurent as Emmanuel
 Georges Géret as Raymond
 Brahim Haggiag as the Arab
 Alfred Adam as the prosecutor
 Jean-Pierre Zola as the employer
 Mimmo Palmara as Monsieur Masson
 Angela Luce as Madame Masson
 Larry J. McDonald as the bearded man at the port

Production
Alain Delon originally was announced for the lead.

References

External links
 

1967 films
1967 drama films
Italian drama films
1960s Italian-language films
Films based on French novels
Films based on works by Albert Camus
Films directed by Luchino Visconti
Films shot in Algeria
Films with screenplays by Suso Cecchi d'Amico
Films produced by Dino De Laurentiis
Films scored by Piero Piccioni
1960s Italian films